Ron Taylor is a former Australian international lawn bowler.

Bowls career

World Bowls Championship
Taylor won the team event (Leonard Trophy) silver medal at the 1980 World Outdoor Bowls Championship in Frankston, Victoria.

National
Taylor represented Western Australia 180 times  and was the Mandurah Bowling and Recreation Club champion 29 times (3 singles, 10 pairs, 6 triples, 10 fours).

Awards
He was indicted into the WA Bowls Hall of Fame in 2006.

References

Australian male bowls players
Living people
Year of birth missing (living people)